Sarcolaena is a genus of flowering plants in the family Sarcolaenaceae. This family is endemic to Madagascar. There are about 8 species in the genus.

Species include:

 Sarcolaena codonochlamys Baker
 Sarcolaena delphinensis Cavaco
 Sarcolaena eriophora Thouars
 Sarcolaena grandiflora Thouars
 Sarcolaena humbertiana Cavaco
 Sarcolaena isaloensis Randrianasolo & Miller
 Sarcolaena multiflora Thouars
 Sarcolaena oblongifolia F.Gérard

References

External links

 
Malvales genera
Taxonomy articles created by Polbot